Mera Pind is a book written by Giani Gurdit Singh. In continuous print since it was first published in 1961, the book is considered a classic in the Punjabi language.

Writing in The Illustrated Weekly of India, Khushwant Singh wrote; “Mera Pind by Giani Gurdit Singh is a collection of delightful essays on various aspects of village life in the Eastern Punjab. The book gives us a lively picture of pastoral life, written in delectable prose, studded with aphorisms, anecdotes, proverbs and songs. The one thing that will give Mera Pind a long lease of life, if not immortality, is the fact that the author has used the Punjabi language as it is spoken by the common people, The Punjabi of Mera Pind is full-blooded, rugged and masculine.”

It is a recommended text for the Masters classes in Punjabi literature by various universities. The book is known as the dictionary of the cultural legacy of the Punjab.

References

Punjabi-language books